John Bernard Hearnshaw  (born 16 March 1946) is a New Zealand astronomer who is Emeritus Professor of Astronomy at the University of Canterbury. He served as director of the Mt John University Observatory at the University of Canterbury from 1976 to 2008. He is a member of the International Astronomical Union and was president of its Commission 30 (on radial velocities) from 1997 to 2000. He is a fellow of the Royal Society of New Zealand and the Royal Astronomical Society of New Zealand. In 2017, he was honoured with a Queen's Birthday honour for his astronomical work. The minor planet 5207 Hearnshaw is named after him.

References

Living people
1946 births
20th-century New Zealand astronomers
People from Wellington City
Alumni of Trinity College, Cambridge
Alumni of the University of Cambridge
Australian National University alumni
University of Canterbury alumni
Fellows of the Royal Society of New Zealand
Academic staff of the University of Canterbury
Members of the New Zealand Order of Merit
21st-century New Zealand astronomers